The following elections occurred in the year 1981.

Africa
 Central African Republic presidential election
 Djiboutian presidential election
 Egyptian presidential confirmation referendum 
 Rwandan parliamentary election
 South African general election
 Sudanese parliamentary election
 Tunisian parliamentary election

Asia
 1981 Burmese general election
 July 1981 Iranian presidential election
 October 1981 Iranian presidential election
 Israeli legislative election
 1981 Kuwaiti general election
 Nepalese Rastriya Panchayat election
 South Korean presidential election

Europe
 1981 Belgian general election
 1981 Danish parliamentary election
 1981 Dutch general election
 1981 Greek legislative election
 1981 Irish general election
 1981 Maltese general election
 1981 Norwegian parliamentary election

European Parliament
 European Parliament election, 1981 (Greece)

France
 1981 French legislative election
 1981 French presidential election

North America
 1981 Honduran general election

Canada
 1981 Edmonton municipal plebiscite
 1981 Manitoba general election
 1981 Nova Scotia general election
 1981 Ontario general election
 1981 Quebec general election

Caribbean
 1981 Barbadian general election
 1981 Trinidad and Tobago general election

United States
 1981 United States gubernatorial elections

United States gubernatorial
 1981 United States gubernatorial elections

United States mayoral
 1981 Pittsburgh mayoral election

Pennsylvania
 1981 Pittsburgh mayoral election

Oceania
 1981 New Zealand general election

Australia
 Boothby by-election
 New South Wales state election
 Tasmanian power referendum
 Wentworth by-election

South America

Falkland Islands
 1981 Falkland Islands general election

See also

 
1981
Elections